The William & Mary scandal of 1951 was a transcript-altering scandal at the College of William & Mary in Williamsburg, Virginia, United States. Prior to World War II, William & Mary tried to become a formidable NCAA Division I athletics power despite its small size (approximately 1,500 students attended the school in the late 1930s). Although the school had always been known as a top tier liberal arts university, pressures to be as equally successful in sports—especially football, men's basketball and baseball—had been mounting for over a decade by the time the scandal was discovered in 1951.

The scandal
In 1946, the William & Mary Board of Visitors announced their goal of achieving more contest wins than losses. Rube McCray, the head football coach from 1944–1950, was given a substantial pay raise so that consistently winning teams could be produced. As a side effect of this decision, almost all of the college's scholastic financial aid was given to athletes coming into William & Mary, despite some of them having minimal academic qualifications. The football program was initially successful after World War II with the influx of veterans, but in order to continue the success, members of the athletic department found it necessary to modify players' high school transcripts to get them admitted to the college. Later, football players were given credit and grades for summer school classes they never attended. McCray, who jointly served as the school's athletic director and head football coach, acknowledged that the problems were on "his watch," but said he had nothing to do with altering any players' transcripts. Throughout the entire time of the changes, circa 1947–1950, none of the players knew their grades or transcripts had been changed. An initial investigation in late 1949 by the college's registrar J. Wilfred Lambert, who also was Dean of Students, discovered the transcript altering, but could not determine the culprits. Players, at the time, did not realize there were any problems. After Lambert's report to the college's president, the procedure for handling transcripts of athletes was completely revised. No action was taken against anyone in the athletic department.

From 1940 to 1949, the William & Mary Indians football teams were more dominant than any other era in the program's history. The 1942 team, under head coach Carl Voyles (1939–1944), compiled a 9–1–1 overall record and defeated perennial football powerhouse University of Oklahoma, 14–7, in Norman. In several of the seasons after the war they were ranked in the national top 20. They also routinely played the country's top teams, even managing to tie the 3rd-ranked North Carolina in 1948. Twenty-four total players were drafted to the National Football League (NFL), some of whom went on to have highly successful professional careers. The Indians won two Southern Conference championships and played in their first two bowl games on January 1, 1948 and January 1, 1949. Some of the football success in the years after 1946 can be attributed, in part, to gaining some good athletes through false transcripts.

Repercussions
In February 1950, William & Mary joined the NCAA and some faculty believed the school's athletic admissions standards would not be in compliance with the national standards. Nelson Marshall, dean of the college, began an investigation and uncovered a variety of issues including giving grades to football players who had not taken the classes. He reported his findings to William & Mary President John Pomfret in April 1951 and also to the school's board of visitors. Pomfret was reluctant to act swiftly because of promises made to McCray and the men's basketball coach, Barney Wilson. Pomfret had even recommended that McCray become a full-time physical education professor despite the evidence of his wrongdoing. 

Information regarding the scandal was leaked to the press, and shortly thereafter it had become a lead story in many national media outlets. There were many discussions among board members, between Pomfret and the board, and between Pomfret and the coaches. Within several days both McCray and Wilson resigned. The public exposure caused a rift between the Board of Visitors and the college faculty. The faculty maintained that their "control of all phases of intercollegiate athletics" was required by the Southern Association of Colleges and Schools to maintain membership. Pomfret resigned amid the turmoil and was replaced by a non-academic naval officer, Alvin Duke Chandler. In protest to this hiring, because the board of visitors did not allow the faculty any participation in the presidential search, several faculty members and the dean of the college resigned. 

As a result the athletic program at William & Mary dramatically changed. From 1951 through 1954 the teams were competitive even though in 1953 there were only 24 players on the team. But the "big time" football years were gone forever because the faculty would never let anyone forget about how the school's academics had been tainted. Starting in 1955, the football team began losing more games than it won. Between 1955 and 1964, the Indians failed to yield a single season with a .500 record or better. The teams turned around under coaches Marv Levy and Lou Holtz from 1964 through the rest of the 1960s, but the scandal had done its damage.

Historical context
The William & Mary scandal of 1951 occurred during a time in American college history that was unique among all other periods. Colleges across the United States were starting to feel pressures to succeed on the field (or court) as well as in the classroom. William & Mary's was not the first academic-athletic scandal to surface; for example, the United States Military Academy (Army) football team had been involved in academic cheating and some of the players, including the coach's son, were forced to leave the school. 

The emphasis on athletics over academics had now become a major point of discussion among college and university governing bodies. William & Mary, which was the first college in the nation to establish an academic honor code, was an especially apt example of the pressures that universities faced when dealing with their athletics programs. These scandals had brought to light the issues at hand, and a refocus on academics, not athletics, had resulted.

See also
1951 Army Cadets football team – the Army team that was also in violation of their honor code, and players were subsequently kicked off

References

Further reading
Kickoffs and Kickbacks: The 1951 Football Scandal at William and Mary. Gosnell, Joan. M.A. Thesis, The College of William & Mary. 1990. 
The Sound and the Fury: The Football Scandal of 1951. Frechette, Fred. The Alumni Gazette. August 2000.
Smith, Ronald A.  “The William and Mary Athletic Scandal of 1951: Governance and the Battle for Academic and Athletic Integrity,” Journal of Sport History (34, 3 (Fall 2007), 353-373.

1951 college football season
1951 NCAA baseball season
1951–52 NCAA men's basketball season
Academic scandals
College basketball controversies in the United States
College football controversies
William & Mary Tribe baseball
William & Mary Tribe football
William & Mary Tribe men's basketball
1951 in Virginia